Ivan San Miguel (born 12 January 1985) is a Spanish male artistic gymnast who is a member of the national team.  He participated at the 2008 Summer Olympics. He also competed at world championships, including the 2010 World Artistic Gymnastics Championships in Rotterdam, Netherlands.

References

1985 births
Living people
Spanish male artistic gymnasts
Place of birth missing (living people)
Gymnasts at the 2008 Summer Olympics
Olympic gymnasts of Spain